Rustem Nailevich Mukhametshin (born 2 April 1984) is a Russian former professional football player. He played as a defensive midfielder.

Club career
He made his Russian Premier League debut for FC Mordovia Saransk on 20 July 2012 in a game against FC Lokomotiv Moscow.

Personal life
He is the younger brother of Ruslan Mukhametshin.

Honours

Club
Tosno
 Russian Cup: 2017–18

Career statistics

External links
 

1984 births
Footballers from Kazan
Living people
Russian footballers
Association football defenders
FC Mordovia Saransk players
Russian Premier League players
FC Tosno players
FC Rubin Kazan players